Piet Hesse (26 December 1872 – 4 March 1936) was a Dutch comedian of the late 19th and early 20th century.

He collaborated with Lion Solser. Together they featured in the 1896 comedy film Gestoorde hengelaar by M.H. Laddé, which was the first Dutch fictional film. Later they featured again in the 1900 and 1906 comedy films both titled Solser en Hesse.

Hesse was born in Amsterdam as the son of Jacques Hesse and Antonia Elisabeth Schmand. He was married to Anna Hesse-Slauderhof and worked together with her.

References

External links 
Piet Hesse, EYE Film Institute Netherlands
Solser en Hesse, EYE Film Institute Netherlands

1872 births
1936 deaths
Dutch male comedians
Dutch male silent film actors
Male actors from Amsterdam
20th-century Dutch people